The Pacific Tigers women's basketball team is an NCAA Division I member that represents the University of the Pacific part of the West Coast Conference. The team is based in Stockton, California. They play their home games at the Alex G. Spanos Center.

History
Pacific began play in 1975. They played in the NorCal Conference from 1975 to 1982. They played in the Big West Conference from 1984 to 2013. 

They haven't played in the NCAA tournament, but they have played in the WNIT in 2012, 2013, 2014, 2015, 2019. To date, Pacific has recorded just four wins over a team ranked in the top 25 of AP Poll, with none since 2003. As of the end of the 2015–16 season, the Tigers have an all-time record of 544–612.

Conference history

Postseason history

WNIT appearances
The Tigers have appeared in the Women's National Invitation Tournament five times. They have a record of 4–5.

References

External links